The Saint Vincent and the Grenadines national U-20 football team is the national youth association football team of Saint Vincent and the Grenadines. It is one of the strongest youth teams in the Caribbean.

Notable players

Romano Snagg
Quillian Tash
Dwayne Sandy
Cornelius Stewart
Myron Samuel

Current squad

References

Under-20
Caribbean national under-20 association football teams